is a 2011 Japanese anime television series created by , an artist collective consisting of director Tatsuyuki Nagai, screenwriter Mari Okada, and character designer Masayoshi Tanaka. The anime was produced by A-1 Pictures and aired in Fuji TV's noitamina block between April and June 2011. It is currently licensed in North America by Aniplex of America.

A novelization by Mari Okada was serialized in Media Factory's Da Vinci magazine from March to July 2011. A manga adaptation illustrated by Mitsu Izumi began serialization in the May 2012 issue of Shueisha's Jump Square magazine. A visual novel adaptation for the PlayStation Portable was released by 5pb. in August 2012. An anime film sequel was released in Japanese theaters on August 31, 2013. A live action television drama film adaptation premiered on September 21, 2015 on Fuji TV.

Plot
In Chichibu, Saitama, a group of six sixth-grade-age childhood friends drift apart after one of them, Meiko "Menma" Honma, dies in an accident. Five years after the incident, the leader of the group, Jinta Yadomi, has withdrawn from society, does not attend high school, and lives as a recluse. One summer day, the ghost of an older-looking Menma appears beside him and asks to have a wish granted, reasoning that she cannot pass on into the afterlife until it is fulfilled. At first, he only tries to help her minimally because he thinks he is hallucinating. But since Menma does not remember what her wish is, Jinta gathers his estranged friends together once again, believing that they are the key to solving this problem. All of the group joins him, though most of them do so reluctantly. However, things grow increasingly complicated when his friends accuse him of not being able to get over Menma's death, as they cannot see nor hear her and believe Jinta is hallucinating. Menma shows her presence to the group in order to prove that she is indeed real. All the group members eventually wish to shoulder the blame for Menma's death and long-hidden feelings among the group are rekindled. The group struggles as they grow from trying to help Menma move on and help each other move on as well.

Characters

Child Jinta 
Teen Jinta 
Live-action actor: Nijirō Murakami / Ryoka Minamide (childhood)
Jinta is a childhood friend of Naruko, Atsumu, Chiriko, Meiko and Tetsudo. As a child, Jinta was the de facto leader of the self-proclaimed Super Peace Busters. Jinta was energetic and outgoing during his childhood, but became withdrawn and isolated after the deaths of Meiko and his mother. After Meiko's death the Super Peace Busters drifted apart and Jinta eventually became a hikikomori, refusing to go to school and confining himself to his home. As a child, he had a crush on Meiko but refused to admit it when asked. This started the chain of events that led to her accidental death. He initially believes that the Meiko that appears to him is not a ghost, but rather a manifestation of his stress, calling her "the beast of summer". He eventually becomes hesitant to grant her wish out of fear that she will vanish again. Nonetheless, Meiko's appearance encourages him to venture outside and reconnect with the members of the Super Peace Busters. He is a natural leader with his friends always following him.
 
 
 Live-action actor: Minami Hamabe / Kanon Tani
 Meiko was a girl of mixed Russian and Japanese ancestry who died in an accident as a child, but appears before Jinta one summer day years later as a ghost. Although she is aware of her death, Meiko is talkative and lively. She greatly values the childhood memories and friendship she once shared with the others, and recalls her memories of her friends and family, including that she had once requested something from Jinta. When she appears to Jinta, she has aged somewhat, but still retains childlike speech patterns and tendencies. She is also clothed in the dress she was wearing the day that she died, and always goes barefoot ever since losing her shoes in the accident that took her life. The only non-childish memory she recalls is that it must have been hard to have found a photo of her when she didn't flash a V sign with her fingers, for the shrine to her memory at her home. Though only Jinta has the ability to see or hear her, Meiko appears to be able to interact with the world around her: opening doors, cooking food, eating, and even playing video games, with many of these activities shown in scenes without Jinta present. Characters that she embraces feel that the air around her has become heavier (Anaru), or wonder why he has gotten goosebumps (Poppo), or noting a faint scent he hasn't smelled in a while (her brother Satoshi). The others call her by her childhood nickname "Menma", and she similarly refers to the Super Peace Busters by their childhood nicknames. Jinta has stated that she is selfless, only crying when others are hurt. Meiko does not hold a grudge towards her friends for the accident but hopes to pass on so that she can be reincarnated and once more be in the same world as her friends. She held Jinta in special regard when she was alive and still cares for him and is worried about his current state. In the last episode, he reads her letter to him that says her kind of "love" was the kind of love where she wanted to be his bride.
 
 
 Live-action actor: Airi Matsui and Shivani Narayanan / Chinami Yoshioka (childhood)
 A childhood friend of Jinta, Atsumu, Chiriko, Tetsudo and Meiko. Naruko displays a cold attitude towards Jinta, especially while in front of her friends, but is secretly worried about his wellbeing. Naruko is described as a person easily influenced by others, hanging out with and playing along with the actions of other girls around her even when she doesn't agree with them. She had admired Meiko, and strove to be like her when they were children, though she was simultaneously envious of her relationship with Jinta. She attends the same high school as Jinta and is closest to him at the start of the series, even dropping off homework for him while he refuses to attend class. She tells him that she is disappointed by his current lifestyle, but still shows lingering feelings, even painting her nails before she goes to see him. She doubts Meiko's return, but remains jealous of the fact that Jinta still looks only at her. She also feels guilty for asking the question that led to Meiko’s death. Atsumu states that both of them were left behind and are trapped by their unrequited feelings for Jinta and Meiko, respectively.
 
 Child Atsumu 
 Teen Atsumu 
 Live-action actor: Jun Shison / Ruiki Sato (childhood)
 A childhood friend of Jinta, Naruko, Chiriko, Tetsudo and Meiko. In the present, Atsumu holds a condescending and hateful attitude towards Jinta. He becomes agitated whenever Meiko is mentioned and tries to hide that he is still distraught over her death. He and Chiriko attend the same elite high school, which Jinta was unable to enter having failed the entrance exams. Atsumu is handsome, athletic, and popular, but still trapped by the memory of Meiko. He keeps a white sundress similar to hers in his closet. He claims that he can also see Meiko's spirit, and even spoke on her behalf, but this 'ghost' turned out to be Atsumu himself, who sometimes wanders the forests at night dressed in a wig and the white sundress. He feels like he is to blame for Meiko's death, because he'd confessed his feelings for Meiko to her on the day of her accident, only she then told him "later," and she has to hurry after Jintan, and he believes that he is the one that should be haunted by Meiko's ghost because of it. Although he stops crossdressing after he is caught, he is still tormented by the idea of Meiko's spirit appearing only to Jinta. Atsumu tells Naruko that they were both left behind the others by their unrequited feelings for Jinta and Meiko, saying that they are kindred spirits. Atsumu has a dark, manipulative side driven by both his affection for Meiko and his inferiority complex from childhood with mild feelings of jealousy towards Jinta.

Live-action actor: Marie Iitoyo / Karen Ichihara (childhood)
A childhood friend of Jinta, Naruko, Atsumu, Tetsudo and Meiko. Chiriko is the quiet observer of the group and has an extremely serious and logical personality. She can be critical of others, and in particular scolds Naruko for her habit of following others. She and Atsumu are the only two of the Super Peace Busters who remained close friends as the years passed. The two are seen together so often that they are mistaken for lovers by their classmates and a shopkeeper. She has feelings for Atsumu, but shows contempt for him whenever she sees that he has not gotten over Meiko's death. She retrieved the hairpin that Atsumu threw away after being rejected by Meiko, and even wears it when she is alone. At times, she plays the voice of reason for Atsumu as well as the role of a guardian. She knows of his feelings of guilt over Meiko's death and suspected that he was crossdressing as a means of coping. She often sketches while idle, even doodling Atsumu wearing Meiko's sundress. Chiriko feels indifferent over Meiko's return, doubting her intentions or if she has truly forgiven everyone. However, like all the other characters, she loves her and was deeply saddened by her death as a child, because they were good friends. She admits to Naruko that she is in love with Atsumu, but believes that he will never return her love because she cannot win against Meiko. Chiriko feels that he is irreplaceable to her, thus she aids the effort to have Meiko achieve nirvana. It is revealed that she secretly felt guilty for Menma's death for spoiling the question Naruko was going to ask as she believed it influenced her behavior. In the series finale, after everyone finds out that each of them had secret selfish reasons for helping Meiko pass on, she, like everyone else, decides to help Meiko only because she loves her.
 
 Child Tetsudo 
 Teen Tetsudo 
 Live-action actor: Yuta Takahata / Santa Takahashi (childhood)
 A childhood friend of Jinta, Naruko, Atsumu, Chiriko and Meiko. During their childhood, he greatly admired Jinta and frequently called him 'amazing' or 'cool'. He admits that he was always grateful to the group for including him as he was an awkward child. Although he has dropped out of school, he is a world traveler who earns money by taking various part-time jobs and lives in their old secret base when not abroad. Tetsudo is worldly and mellow. He is eager to see the Super Peace Busters get back together, immediately believing that Jinta could see and talk to Meiko. He is the first of the group to tell Meiko that he will fulfill her wish and help her spirit pass on. When the group fights, he is often the one who takes the initiative to smooth things out. However, it is later revealed that Tetsudo hides feelings of guilt for his role in Meiko's accident beneath his happy-go-lucky personality. Having witnessed her fall into the river, he blames himself for seeing all of it, from the top of the slope that Menma tumbled down, and seeing her drift further and further away down the river.

Media

Printed media
A novel adaptation of the anime written by Mari Okada was serialized in Media Factory's Da Vinci magazine between the March and July 2011 issues. The first of two volumes were published under Media Factory's MF Bunko Da Vinci imprint on July 25, 2011. A manga adaptation illustrated by Mitsu Izumi began serialization in the May 2012 issue of Shueisha's Jump Square magazine from April 4, 2012 and ended in March 2013, compiled in three volumes.

The novel and manga abbreviate the story a bit. For example, Menma in print "shows" herself to her friends at the barbecue corresponding to anime episode 4, by lighting and waving a sparkler, earlier than the anime's episode 8.

Anime

The 11-episode Anohana anime television series directed by Tatsuyuki Nagai and produced by A-1 Pictures aired in Japan between April 14 and June 23, 2011 on Fuji TV's Noitamina programming block. The screenplay was written by Mari Okada, and chief animator Masayoshi Tanaka also designed the characters. The sound director is Jin Aketagawa of Magic Capsule, and the anime's music was produced by Remedios. NIS America licensed the series for release in North America with English subtitles, and released the anime on DVD and Blu-ray Disc in a two-disc compilation on July 3, 2012. Aniplex of America announced they would re-release the series with an English dub at their Sakura-Con panel on April 16, 2017, and it was released on October 31, 2017. This series was broadcast in Italy on Rai 4. Top-Insight initially licensed the series in Southeast Asia. Top-Insight's license expired and the anime is now licensed by Muse Communication.

The series uses two pieces of theme music. The anime's original soundtrack was released on December 21, 2011.

An anime film, subtitled , was released in Japanese theaters on August 31, 2013. The film is set during school summer break a year after the anime. The surviving Super Peace Busters have agreed to each write a letter to Menma, then meet at the secret base to send those letters. Chiriko Tsurumi wrote her letter first and calls to remind and encourage the others. During the film there are many memory bits of the joys and trauma they went through and flashbacks, many to the events in the anime series, some new or expanding on what was previously shown. Appearing one year afterwards are the five surviving Super Peace Busters, Menma's brother Satoshi, her mother Irene, and the owner of the game store where Jinta works. Jinta's father is shown in a flashback set after the anime series. The song is also used for an alternate opening for the anime's rerun on noitaminA starting in July 2013. Aniplex of America released the film in standard edition DVD and Blu-ray Disc (BD) sets and a limited edition BD/DVD combo pack on July 15, 2014. Muse Communication holds the license to the film in Southeast Asia.

Visual novel
A visual novel adaptation developed by Guyzware for the PlayStation Portable was published by 5pb. on August 30, 2012.

Live-action drama
A live action Japanese television drama film adaptation premiered on Fuji TV on September 21, 2015. The theme song is a cover of "Secret Base (Kimi ga Kureta Mono)" performed by Silent Siren.

Reception
In a quarterly financial report, Fuji Media Holdings singles out Anohana as one of their top anime properties, calling it a "big hit" and announcing that the first DVD volume sold 56,000 copies.

The film grossed US$10.2 million and was the 14th highest-grossing anime film in Japan in 2013.

Anohana has received positive critical reception and has been considered one of the best anime of the 2010s by Polygon; writer Julia Lee highlighted how "Anohana has turned the toughest people into crying puddles on the floor, not only because the entire premise is built around a tragedy, but because it’s a reminder that friends grow apart and people change". Crunchyroll also included it in such a list; reviewer Daryl Harding commented that the anime "blew the tear buds of people all around the world" and that "Somehow the team can just pull at your heartstrings so much that even nearly a decade on, I still feel those tugs". Writing for Forbes, Lauren Orsini considered it to be one of the five best anime of 2011; she wrote, "Anohana is a moving journey about the ties that bind even beyond the grave that will leave you misty-eyed". Both Harding and Orsini stated the anime was a fundamental milestone in Mari Okada's career.

See also
The Anthem of the Heart

References

External links
 Anime official website 
 Anime official website 
 Television drama official website  
 Visual novel official website 
 

2012 video games
A-1 Pictures
Animated films based on animated series
Anime with original screenplays
Aniplex franchises
Coming-of-age anime and manga
Films about child death
Animated films about friendship
Films set in Saitama Prefecture
Films with screenplays by Mari Okada
Japan-exclusive video games
Japanese drama television series
Japanese ghost films
Japanese serial novels
2010s Japanese-language films
Noitamina
PlayStation Portable games
PlayStation Portable-only games
Shueisha manga
Shōnen manga
Television shows adapted into films
Television shows set in Saitama Prefecture
Television shows written by Mari Okada
Video games developed in Japan
Visual novels
Works about child death